The Springfield Metropolitan Statistical Area, as defined by the United States Census Bureau, is an area consisting of two counties in Central Illinois, anchored by the city of Springfield. As of the 2000 census, the MSA had a population of 201,437 (though a July 1, 2009 estimate placed the population at 208,182).

Metropolitan Springfield is southwest of Chicago, south of Peoria, southwest of Bloomington and Champaign, and west of Decatur.

Counties
Menard
Sangamon

Communities

Places with more than 100,000 inhabitants
Springfield (Principal city)

Places with 10,000 to 20,000 inhabitants
Chatham

Places with 1,000 to 10,000 inhabitants

Athens
Auburn
Divernon
Grandview
Jerome
Leland Grove
New Berlin

Pawnee
Petersburg
Riverton
Rochester
Sherman
Southern View
Virden (partial)
Williamsville

Places with 500 to 1,000 inhabitants
Greenview
Illiopolis
Loami
Pleasant Plains
Spaulding
Tallula
Thayer

Places with fewer than 500 inhabitants
Berlin
Buffalo
Cantrall
Clear Lake
Curran
Dawson
Mechanicsburg
Oakford

Unincorporated places

Andrew
Archer
Atterbury
Barclay
Bates
Bissell
Bolivia
Bradfordton
Breckenridge
Cimic
Devereux
Fancy Prairie
Farmingdale

Glenarm
Hubly
Ildes Park Place
Lowder
New City
Old Berlin
Riddle Hill
Roby
Salisbury
Sicily
Sweet Water
Tice
Toronto

Townships (Sangamon County)

 Auburn
 Ball
 Buffalo Hart
 Capital
 Cartwright
 Chatham
 Clear Lake
 Cooper
 Cotton Hill
 Curran
 Divernon
 Fancy Creek
 Gardner
 Illiopolis

 Island Grove
 Lanesville
 Loami
 Maxwell
 Mechanicsburg
 New Berlin
 Pawnee
 Rochester
 Salisbury (former township)
 Springfield
 Talkington
 Williams
 Woodside

Precincts (Menard County)
Athens North 
Athens South 
Atterberry 
Fancy Prairie 
Greenview 
Indian Creek 
Irish Grove 
Oakford 
Petersburg East 
Petersburg North 
Petersburg South 
Rock Creek 
Sand Ridge 
Sugar Grove 
Tallula

Demographics
As of the census of 2000, there were 201,437 people, 83,595 households, and 54,361 families residing within the MSA. The racial makeup of the MSA was 88.11% White, 9.08% African American, 0.21% Native American, 1.04% Asian, 0.03% Pacific Islander, 0.37% from other races, and 1.16% from two or more races. Hispanic or Latino of any race were 1.04% of the population.

The median income for a household in the MSA was $44,777, and the median income for a family was $53,448. Males had a median income of $37,283 versus $27,912 for females. The per capita income for the MSA was $22,379.

See also
Illinois census statistical areas

References

 
Geography of Sangamon County, Illinois
Geography of Menard County, Illinois
Metropolitan areas of Illinois